Lloyd Thomas Evans AO FRS FAA (6 August 1927 – 23 March 2015) was a New Zealand plant physiologist who made his career in Australia.

Early life and education
Evans was born in Wanganui in 1927. He received his secondary education at Wanganui Technical College and at Wanganui Collegiate School. He studied at the Canterbury Agricultural College in Lincoln from 1945 to 1950 and in 1947, he won the Hunter Brown Cup for that year's best dissertation on sheep husbandry. In 1948, he represented Lincoln at the Joynt Scroll, a debating competition between New Zealand universities; he also won that year's Hunter Brown Cup. He achieved first class honours in field husbandry and in 1950, he was a part-time lecturer in agricultural botany while completing his masters. In 1951, he was Lincoln's second Rhodes Scholar and went to Brasenose College, Oxford. He subsequently won a Harkness Fellowship to the California Institute of Technology, a fellowship to the National Academies of Sciences, Engineering, and Medicine to the United States National Agricultural Library in Beltsville, Maryland, and a research fellowship to Churchill College, Cambridge.

Career
He was Chief of the Division of Plant Industry, at Commonwealth Scientific and Industrial Research Organisation, (CSIRO) from 1971 to 1978, and President of the Australian Academy of Science from 1978 to 1982.

Awards and honours
1971 Fellow of the Australian Academy of Science (FAA)
1974 Bledisloe Medal
1976 Fellow of the Royal Society (FRS)
1978 Honorary doctorate of the University of Canterbury (LLD)
1979 Officer of the Order of Australia (AO)
2001 Centenary Medal
He was also a Fellow of the Norwegian Academy of Science and Letters.

Selected publications
Crop Evolution, Adaptation and Yield , Cambridge University Press, 1996,

References

External links
Interviews with Australian scientists, 2003, Australian Academy of Science  
Obituary, Australian Academy of Science

1927 births
2015 deaths
People from Whanganui
Australian physiologists
Plant physiologists
Officers of the Order of Australia
Fellows of the Royal Society
Fellows of the Australian Academy of Science
Members of the Norwegian Academy of Science and Letters
Presidents of the Australian Academy of Science
People educated at Whanganui City College
People educated at Whanganui Collegiate School
Lincoln University (New Zealand) alumni
Academic staff of the Lincoln University (New Zealand)
New Zealand Rhodes Scholars